Jim Sharp (17 May 1882 – 7 October 1945) was an Australian rules footballer who played for the Fitzroy Football Club and Collingwood Football Club in the Victorian Football League (VFL).

Sharp was a centre half-back and started his career in 1901 with Fitzroy. He was a member of the Fitzroy side which claimed back to back premierships in 1904 and 1905. Sharp was the club's best and fairest winner in the 1904 season and was also voted best afield in the Grand Final that year. He captained both Fitzroy and the Victorian interstate team from 1908 to 1910, leading Victoria in the inaugural interstate championship series. 

In 1911 he crossed to Collingwood but broke his shin during his second season which ended his career. He stayed at Collingwood in an administrative capacity and in 1913 was elected club president. When a player failed to arrive at Geelong in time for a VFL game in 1917 Sharp filled in although an injury sustained soon after he took the field ensured he did not get much game time. He remained club president until 1923.

References

External links

1882 births
1945 deaths
Collingwood Football Club players
Fitzroy Football Club players
Fitzroy Football Club Premiership players
Mitchell Medal winners
Collingwood Football Club administrators
Australian rules footballers from Melbourne
Two-time VFL/AFL Premiership players
People from Fitzroy, Victoria